Extra Yarn is a 2012 picture book written by Mac Barnett and illustrated by Jon Klassen. The book tells the story of a girl named Annabelle who knits for everyone in her town with a supply of yarn, until an archduke wants the yarn for himself. The book was a recipient of the 2013 Caldecott Honor for its illustrations. It received a starred review from Publishers Weekly.

In 2014, Weston Woods adapted this book to an animated film, narrated by Nicola Barber, and directed by Soup2Nuts. The film won the ALA Notable Video award by the ALSC.

References

2012 children's books
American picture books
Caldecott Honor-winning works
Yarn
Balzer + Bray books